Richard Alexander Sneed (August 28, 1845 – March 16, 1936) was an American Confederate veteran, Klansman and politician. After serving in the Confederate States Army during the American Civil War of 1861-1865, he was a co-founder of the Ku Klux Klan chapter in Madison County, Tennessee. A Democrat, he served as the Oklahoma Secretary of State from 1923 to 1927, the Oklahoma State Treasurer from 1927 to 1931, and the Oklahoma Secretary of State again from 1931 to 1935.

Early life
Richard Alexander Sneed was born on August 28, 1845, in Tallahatchie County, Mississippi. His father was Albert Sneed and his mother, Maria; they were from South Carolina.

Career
Sneed joined the Army of Northern Virginia of the Confederate States Army during the American Civil War of 1861-1865. He served under General Jubal Early during the Second Battle of Fredericksburg, where he was wounded. He served under General Robert E. Lee during the Battle of Cold Harbor. He was jailed by the Union Army for two months at the Point Lookout Prison in Maryland from April 14 to June 30 of 1865. After the war, Sneed was a co-founder of the Ku Klux Klan chapter of Madison County, Tennessee. He served as the commander-in-chief of the trans-Mississippi division of the United Confederate Veterans in 1927, and the commander-in-chief of the UCV in 1928.

Sneed was an active member of the Democratic Party. He worked a clerk of the circuit court of Madison County for eight years and deputy clerk of the Tennessee Supreme Court. He ran to become the Tennessee Secretary of State, but he was not elected. He moved to Fort Sill, Oklahoma, in 1895 and worked as a merchant. In 1907, he became recorder of deeds for Comanche County. He was the superintendent of the Chickasaw National Recreation Area from 1914 to 1919. He served as the Oklahoma Secretary of State from 1923 to 1927, the Oklahoma State Treasurer from 1927 to 1931, and the Secretary of State again from 1931 to 1935. He became known as the "grand old man of the Democratic Party" in Oklahoma.

Personal life and death
Sneed married Annie R. Bullock, a native of Jackson, Tennessee, in 1861. They had three sons and three daughters. One of his sons, R. R. Sneed, served as the Tennessee Secretary of State from 1913 to 1917. Sneed was a member of the Methodist Episcopal Church, South, and a Mason.

Sneed died on March 16, 1936, in Lawton, Oklahoma. His funeral was held at the Centenary Methodist Church in Lawton.

See also 
 List of members of the United Confederate Veterans

References

1845 births
1936 deaths
American Freemasons
Confederate States Army officers
American Ku Klux Klan members
Oklahoma Democrats
People from Tallahatchie County, Mississippi
People from Lawton, Oklahoma
Secretaries of State of Oklahoma
State treasurers of Oklahoma